Francis Matthew McFaun (born 1939) is a Republican politician who was elected and currently serves in the Vermont House of Representatives. He represents the Washington-4 Representative District.

References

1939 births
Living people
Politicians from Cambridge, Massachusetts
Republican Party members of the Vermont House of Representatives
21st-century American politicians